Bem me Quer (English: Broken Bonds) is a Portuguese soap opera (telenovela) broadcast and produced by TVI. It is written by Maria João Mira. The soap opera (telenovela) premiered on October 26, 2020 and ended on November 12, 2021. It is recorded in Serra da Estrela and also in Aveiro.

History
"Bem me Quer" tells of the adventures of a shepherdess who's spent all her life in a remote village in Serra da Estrela and is suddenly forced to go and live in the city. It's a romantic story that touches on topics such as family and friendship, ambition and greed: but mostly, love. Maria Rita lives with her grandfather, they are small producers of traditional local cheese. She loves her life and wouldn't exchange it for anything, but her freedom and the world she knows are at risk, as the dairy is threatened by imminent bankruptcy.

Actors

Guest cast

Child cast

References

External links

2020 telenovelas
2021 telenovelas
Portuguese telenovelas
Televisão Independente telenovelas
2020 Portuguese television series debuts
2021 Portuguese television series endings
Portuguese-language telenovelas
2020s Portuguese television series